Uvwiẹ or Ẹphrọn (Effurun) is a Niger Delta language spoken by the Uvwie people of southern Nigeria. It is classified alongside Urhobo, Okpe, Isoko and Eruwa as co-ordinate members of South-western Edoid branch of Proto Edoid language spoken by the Uvwie people of southern Nigeria.

Phonology
The phonemic inventory of Uvwie, amongst other things, consists of seven vowels.

The consonant system is somewhat conservative, and nearly the same as that of Urhobo.

References

Edoid languages